The Finnish men's national handball team is the national men's handball team of Finland and is controlled by the Finnish Handball Association.

World Championships record

External links

IHF profile

Men's national handball teams
Handball in Finland
National sports teams of Finland